Bop TV was a television station run by the Bophuthatswana Broadcasting Corporation in the former Republic of Bophuthatswana in South Africa.

History 

Commencing operations in 1984, it primarily transmitted imported programmes in an unedited form, allowing all comical references to black people to be aired. The station transmitted on the UHF band.

In the apartheid era, a sizeable number of white people watched Bop TV, which offered a wider variety of entertainment and current affairs programming than the state-controlled South African Broadcasting Corporation, despite attempts to confine the signal to black areas such as Soweto.

A post-apartheid reshuffling of the SABC in 1996 resulted in the former bantustan broadcasters being integrated into it. This infuriated the bosses of Bop Broadcasting.

In 1997, the State Reorganisation Act led to the creation of subsidies for the former bantustan broadcasters that were now under the SABC's control. The said subsidy ended in November 2001. From now onward, the SABC was now funding Bop Broadcasting in its entirety. In 2003, the SABC announced that they would shut the channel down on 31 July.

List of programmes

Domestic

Music

South Africa Music TV
South Africa On the Beat

Lifestyle

South Africa Panorama

Children's
South Africa Adventures at the Waterhole
South Africa Teeny Bop

Sports

South Africa Bop Sports

Horse racing

South Africa See How They Run

News & current affairs

South Africa Bop TV News

Talk shows
South Africa Rhena Church Hour

Drama
South Africa Stolen Lives

Game show

South Africa Moving Up Quiz

Education

South Africa Edutel

Foreign

Comedy

United States America's Funniest Home Videos
United States America's Funniest People
United Kingdom Are You Being Served?
United States The Army Show
United States Benson
United States Brooklyn Bridge
United Kingdom Brush Strokes
Canada Check It Out!
United States Cheers
Scotland, United Kingdom City Lights
United States Diff'rent Strokes
United Kingdom Don't Wait Up
United Kingdom Drop the Dead Donkey
United Kingdom Executive Stress
United Kingdom Ever Decreasing Circles
United Kingdom Father Charlie
United Kingdom French Fields
United Kingdom Fresh Fields
United States The Fresh Prince of Bel-Air
United States Full House
United States Gimme a Break!
United Kingdom The Good Life
United Kingdom Goodnight Sweetheart
United Kingdom Grace and Favour
Australia Hampton Court
United States Harry
United Kingdom Health and Efficiency
United Kingdom Heartburn Hotel
Australia Hey Dad..!
United States Hit Squad
United Kingdom Joint Account
United Kingdom Keep It in the Family
United Kingdom Keeping Up Appearances
United Kingdom Last of the Summer Wine
Canada Material World
Canada Max Glick
United States Moesha
United Kingdom Murder Most Horrid
United Kingdom Never the Twain
United States Night Court
United Kingdom Oh, Doctor Beeching!
United States Out of This World
United States Punky Brewster
United Kingdom Rich Tea and Symphony
United States Seinfeld
United Kingdom Some Mothers Do 'Ave 'Em
United States Spencer
United States The Ted Knight Show
United Kingdom Three Up, Two Down
United States Three's Company
United States Three's a Crowd
United Kingdom To the Manor Born
United Kingdom Valentine Park
United Kingdom Very Big Very Soon
Australia Willing and Abel
United Kingdom Whose Line Is It Anyway?
United Kingdom 'Allo 'Allo!

Anthology
United States Ghost Story
United States In the Name of Love
United Kingdom Murder Most Horrid
United States Monsters
United States Night Flight
United States Project U.F.O.
United States Shadow Theater

Western

United States The Big Valley
Canada, France Bordertown
United States Empire
United States Father Murphy
United States Lonesome Dove: The Series
Canada Queen of Swords

News

United States Sightings

Drama

United States 21 Jump Street
United Kingdom 99-1
United States, Mexico Acapulco Bay
Canada, France, New Zealand The Adventures of the Black Stallion
United Kingdom All Creatures Great and Small
Australia Bailey's Bird
United States Barnaby Jones
Australia Barrier Reef
Canada The Beachcombers
United Kingdom Bergerac
United Kingdom Between the Lines
United States, Canada Beyond Reality
Australia Blue Heelers
United Kingdom Body & Soul
Australia Bony
Canada, France Bordertown
Australia Breakers
United Kingdom The Broker's Man
United Kingdom The Buddha of Suburbia
Australia Burned Bridge
Canada Catwalk
United Kingdom Chandler & Co
United Kingdom Christabel
United Kingdom Connie
Canada, France Counterstrike
United Kingdom Cracker
United States Crime Story
United Kingdom Crocodile Shoes
Australia Cyclone Tracy
Canada Danger Bay
United Kingdom Dangerfield
United States Dangerous Curves
United Kingdom The Duchess of Duke Street
United States, Canada Due South
Australia The Dunera Boys
United Kingdom Edge of Darkness
United States Eleanor and Franklin
Canada Emilie
Canada E.N.G.
United Kingdom Firm Friends
United States The Flash
Australia A Fortunate Life
United Kingdom Fortunes of War
Australia G.P.
United States Gavilan
United Kingdom The Ginger Tree
United Kingdom Gone to the Dogs
Mexico, United States The Guilt
United States Hardcastle and McCormick
United States Hawkeye
United Kingdom, Australia The Heroes
United States Holocaust
United Kingdom The House of Eliott
United Kingdom Howards' Way
United States In the Heat of the Night
United States Ironside
New Zealand Jackson's Wharf
United States Jessie
United States JFK: Reckless Youth
United Kingdom, United States Kennedy
United States Knight Rider
Australia Land of Hope
United Kingdom The Legend of King Arthur
United Kingdom Lytton's Diary
United Kingdom Love Hurts
United States Manions of America
Australia The Man from Snowy River
New Zealand Marlin Bay
United States Miami Sands
United States The Mod Squad
United Kingdom My Family and Other Animals
Canada North of 60
United States One West Waikiki
United Kingdom The Onedin Line
United States The Outsiders
Australia Pacific Drive
United Kingdom A Perfect Spy
Australia Police Rescue
United Kingdom The Professionals
United States Quantum Leap
United States Q.E.D.
United States Rags to Riches
United Kingdom Rescue
United Kingdom Rides
United States The Rockford Files
United States Roots
United States Roots: The Next Generations
Canada Scoop
Australia Seven Deadly Sins
New Zealand Shark in the Park
Canada Side Effects
United Kingdom Silas Marner
United States Star Trek: Deep Space 9
United States Star Trek: The Next Generation
Canada Street Legal
United States The Streets of San Francisco
United States Supercarrier
United States Swamp Thing
United States Swans Crossing
Australia Sword of Honour
United Kingdom Tender Is the Night
United States Thunder in Paradise
United States Tour of Duty
Canada Tropical Heat
Canada T. and T.
United States Walker Texas Ranger
United States Wiseguy
United States The Women of Brewster Place
United States The Wonder Years
United Kingdom Wycliffe
United States Zorro

Sports
United States Gillette World Sport Special
United Kingdom Trans World Sport
United States WCW Pro

Music
United Kingdom Later... with Jools Holland
United States Night Flight

Lifestyle

United States Lifestyles of the Rich and Famous
Canada Painted House

Soap opera

United States Another Life
Australia Chances
Australia E Street
Australia Echo Point
United Kingdom Eldorado
Australia Home and Away
New Zealand Homeward Bound
Canada Mount Royal
Australia Paradise Beach
Australia Richmond Hill
United States Santa Barbara
Australia Starting Out
Canada Strange Paradise
Canada Time of Your Life

Variety
United States Night Flight
Ireland Secrets
United States Showtime at the Apollo

Documentary
Canada Audubon Wildlife Theatre
United States Born Famous
United Kingdom Civilisation
Australia The Extraordinary
United Kingdom The Face of Tutankhamen
United States Hollywood's Leading Men and Women
Canada Inside the Vatican
United States Mega Movie Magic
United Kingdom Memories of 1970-1991
United States Mysteries of the Bible
United Kingdom Nautilus
United States National Geographic Specials
United States Nature
United Kingdom Police Camera Action!
United Kingdom The Power and the Glory
United States SeaTek
United Kingdom The Shadow Circus: The CIA in Tibet
United Kingdom Tigers on the Tiles

Food

United Kingdom Delia Smith's Cookery Course
United Kingdom Floyd on Britain and Ireland
United Kingdom Ken Hom's Chinese Cookery

News
United States Front Runners

Education

Australia Beyond 2000
Canada F.R.O.G.
Canada Look Up
Canada The Magic Library
United States Newton's Apple
Canada Polka Dot Door
Canada Return to the Magic Library

Travel
United Kingdom Dominika's Planet

Animation

United Kingdom, Wales Operavox: The Animated Operas
United States The Simpsons

Children's

United Kingdom 50/50
United States Adventures from the Book of Virtues
Australia The Adventures of Skippy
United States Adventures of Sonic the Hedgehog
United States, Japan The Adventures of the Galaxy Rangers
Japan The Adventures of the Little Prince
France, Canada The Adventures of Tintin
Australia Adventures on Kythera
United Kingdom, France, Canada Albert - the 5th Musketeer
Japan, Netherlands Alfred J. Kwak
United Kingdom The Alphabet Game
United States, Germany, Canada Amazing Tails
United States Animal Miracles
United Kingdom, France The Animals of Farthing Wood
Spain The Authentic Adventures of Professor Thompson
France, Canada Babar
Spain Basket Fever
United States Batman: The Animated Series
Canada BB and Jennifer
United States Biker Mice from Mars
United States, Canada Beetlejuice
United Kingdom Belfry Witches
United States, Australia The Berenstain Bears
United Kingdom Bertha
New Zealand Betty's Bunch
United States Beverly Hills Teens
Canada The Big Comfy Couch
Canada, France, Belgium, Germany Billy the Cat
United Kingdom The Biz
France Bob Morane
United Kingdom Bod
Canada Bookmice
United Kingdom The Borrowers
United Kingdom The Box of Delights
United Kingdom Breakpoint
United Kingdom The Brollys
Canada Brownstone Kids
Australia Boffins
France, United States Bucky O'Hare and the Toad Wars!
Hungary The Bunny with the Checkered Ears
United States C Bear and Jamal
Australia c/o The Bartons
Canada Camp Cariboo
United States Captain Planet and the Planeteers
United States, Canada Care Bears
United Kingdom Century Falls
United Kingdom Charlie Chalk
New Zealand Children of Fire Mountain
Japan Choppy and the Princess
United Kingdom The Chronicles of Narnia
United States Conan and the Young Warriors
United States, France, Canada Conan the Adventurer
United Kingdom The Country Boy
United Kingdom Count Duckula
United States Critter Gitters
France 
Australia The Curiosity Show
Canada Curse of the Viking Grave
United Kingdom, Canada Cyberkidz
United Kingdom Dappledown Farm
Australia, New Zealand, France Deepwater Haven
France Delfy and His Friends
United States, France Dennis the Menace
United States, France Denver, the Last Dinosaur
Spain Detective Bogey
Australia The Digswell Dog Show
United States Dink, the Little Dinosaur
United States Dino-Riders
United Kingdom, Netherlands Doctor Snuggles
United States, France Dragon Flyz
Canada Eric's World
Australia Escape from Jupiter
United Kingdom Eye of the Storm
United States The Fabulous Reggae Dogs
United Kingdom The Famous Five
Australia Fat Cat and Friends
United States Felix the Cat
Wales Fireman Sam
United Kingdom Five Children and It
Canada The Forest Rangers
New Zealand The Flying Kiwi
United States Flying, Trying and Honking Around
Canada F.R.O.G.
New Zealand Gather Your Dreams
Japan G-Force
United States G.I. Joe Extreme
Australia, United Kingdom The Genie from Down Under
United States Gerbert
United States, France The Get Along Gang
Australia The Girl from Tomorrow
Australia Glad Rags
United Kingdom Gran
Italy The Great Book of Nature
United States The Great Space Coaster
United Kingdom Gumdrop
United Kingdom Haunting of Cassie Palmer
Australia Haydaze
Canada Hello Mrs. Cherrywinkle
United Kingdom Henry's Cat
United States Here Comes the Grump
Australia Hills End
Australia Hot Science
United States The Houndcats
Canada Huckleberry Finn and His Friends
United States Hulk Hogan's Rock 'n' Wrestling
United States, United Kingdom, Scotland Hurricanes
United States Incredible Dennis the Menace
United States, Japan Inhumanoids
Canada Inquiring Minds
United Kingdom Jack in the Box
United States, United Kingdom The Jackson 5ive
United States James Bond Jr.
United States Jay Jay the Jet Plane
United States Jim Henson's Animal Show
United States Jem
Italy Jesus: A Kingdom Without Frontiers
Australia Johnson and Friends
Japan Jungle Book Shōnen Mowgli
Australia Kaboodle
United Kingdom Kevin's Cousins
Australia Kids Down Under
United States Kids TV
United States The Kid-a-Littles
Japan Kimba the White Lion
United States Laurel and Hardy
United States The Legend of Prince Valiant
France, Canada The Legend of White Fang
Croatia, Canada The Little Flying Bears
Canada, United States Little Rosey
United Kingdom Little Sir Nicholas
Canada The Littlest Hobo
Canada Look Up
Canada The Magic Library
France Marsupilami
Canada Mathica's Mathshop
Canada The MAXimum Dimension
Japan Medabots
Australia The Miraculous Mellops
Australia, New Zealand Mirror, Mirror
Australia More Winners
Canada Music Box
Canada, United States My Pet Monster
United States, Japan The New Adventures of Speed Racer
United Kingdom, Canada, United States Noddy in Toyland
United Kingdom Oasis
Canada The Odyssey
United States Old MacDonald's Sing-A-Long Farm
Canada Panda Bear Daycare
United Kingdom Panic Station
United States Pee-wee's Playhouse
United States Pigasso's Place
United Kingdom Pirates
Italy Pocahontas
Canada Polka Dot Door
Yugoslavia, Croatia Professor Balthazar
Australia Pugwall
Australia Pugwall's Summer
United States The Puppy's New Adventures
United States The Puzzle Place
Canada Ramona
United States Rambo: The Force of Freedom
United States The Real Ghostbusters
United Kingdom The Really Wild Show
United States, Canada ReBoot
France Redbeard
Germany Renada
United Kingdom The Return of the Psammead
Canada Return to the Magic Library
United States Rimba's Island
United Kingdom Rosie and Jim
Australia Round the Twist
Canada Ruffus the Dog
United Kingdom, Canada, France Rupert
Japan, United States Saber Rider and the Star Sheriffs
Canada Scoop and Doozie
Canada, France Sea Dogs
United Kingdom The Secret Garden
United States Sesame Street
France, Canada Sharky & George
New Zealand The Shelly T. Turtle Show
Italy Simba the Lion King
United Kingdom Simon and the Witch
Australia Simon Townsend's Wonder World
Austria, Germany Simsala Grimm
United States Skeleton Warriors
United States, France Sky Dancers
United States, Japan Skysurfer Strike Force
France Small Stories
Canada, France The Smoggies
United States, Belgium The Smurfs
United States, Belgium Snorks
United Kingdom Sooty & Co.
France Spartakus & the Sun Beneath the Sea
Australia, Poland Spellbinder
United States Spiral Zone
United Kingdom Spooks of Bottle Bay
New Zealand Star Runner
United States, Canada Star Wars: Droids
United States, Canada Star Wars: Ewoks
United States, United Kingdom, France Stone Protectors
Russia, United States Stories From My Childhood
Japan The Story of Cinderella
United Kingdom Streetwise
United States Superhuman Samurai Syber-Squad
Canada T. and T.
United Kingdom Tales from Bledlow Ridge
United Kingdom, Canada Tales of the Riverbank
United States Tattooed Teenage Alien Fighters from Beverly Hills
United States Teenage Mutant Ninja Turtles
United Kingdom Terrahawks
Japan, United States The Transformers
Spain The Triplets
South Korea, United States Twinkle, the Dream Being
United Kingdom Uncle Jack
France, Japan Ulysses 31
Australia Wonder World!
United States Vid Kids
United States Visionaries: Knights of the Magical Light
Canada Waterville Gang
United Kingdom Wavelength
United Kingdom Who Sir? Me Sir?
United States Wide World of Kids
United States, South Korea Widget the World Watcher
France, United Kingdom The Wild Bunch
United Kingdom The Wild House
Australia Winners
United Kingdom, New Zealand Worzel Gummidge Down Under
Canada, France Zoe and Charlie

Video games

United Kingdom Cybernet
United Kingdom Movies, Games and Videos

Talk shows

United States The 700 Club
United States Jimmy Swaggart
United States Kenneth Copeland
United States The Phil Donahue Show
United States Sally Jesse Raphael

Sci-fi
United States Beyond Reality
Canada RoboCop: The Series
United States VR.5

TV specials

United States The Benny Goodman Special
United States Frosty's Return
United States Inspector Gadget Saves Christmas
United States Tales of Washington Irving
Canada The Teddy Bears' Christmas

Reality

United States Lifestyles of the Rich and Famous

Game shows

United Kingdom The Alphabet Game
United States Infatuation

Telefilms

Australia Cassidy

TV movies
United States And Your Name is Jonah
United States Callie and Son
Austria, United States, Germany Catherine the Great
United Kingdom, Australia Children of the Dragon
United States Cooperstown
United States Criminal Justice
United States Death at Love House
France, United States The Fatal Image
United States Jailbirds
United States The Jesse Owens Story
United States LBJ: The Early Years
United Kingdom, United States Letting Go
United States Memorial Day
United States Mrs. 'Arris Goes to Paris
United States Murder Ordained
United States, United Kingdom Indiscreet
United States Return of the Rebels
United States The Right of the People
United States Rockabye
United Kingdom Silas Marner
New Zealand, Canada The Sound and the Silence
United States Spider-Man
United States The Trial of Harvey Lee Oswald
United Kingdom Under the Sun
United States The Users

References

External links
Bop TV Schedule and Ident, YouTube, 13 January 2010

English-language television stations in South Africa
Television stations in South Africa
Television channels and stations established in 1984
Television channels and stations disestablished in 2003
Bophuthatswana
Defunct mass media in South Africa